The five-story Montreal City Hall (French: Hôtel de Ville de Montréal) is the seat of local government in Montreal, Quebec, Canada. It was designed by architects Henri-Maurice Perrault and Alexander Cowper Hutchison, and built between 1872 and 1878 in the Second Empire style. It is located in Old Montreal, between Place Jacques-Cartier and the Champ de Mars, at 275 Notre-Dame Street East. The closest Metro station is Champ-de-Mars, on the Orange Line.

As one of the best examples of the Second Empire style in Canada, and the first city hall to have been constructed in the country solely for municipal administration, it was designated a National Historic Site of Canada in 1984.

History and architecture

Construction on the building began in 1872 and was completed in 1878. The original building was gutted by fire in March 1922, leaving only the outer wall and destroying many of the city's historic records. The architect Louis Parant was commissioned for the reconstruction, who decided to build an entirely new building with a self-supporting steel structure built inside the shell of the ruins. This new building was modelled after the city hall of the French city of Tours. Other changes included a remodelling of the Mansard roof into a new Beaux-Arts inspired model, with a copper roof instead of the original slate tiles. The new building opened on February 15, 1926.

In 1967 Charles de Gaulle, the president of France, gave his Vive le Québec libre speech from the building's balcony.

See also
 Bonsecours Market - home to Montreal City Hall and Montreal City Council from 1852-1878

References

External links

 Rémillard, Francois. Montreal architecture: A Guide to Styles and Buildings. Montreal: Meridian Press, 1990.
 Montreal City Hall—Hôtel de ville de Montréal
Photograph:Montreal City Hall, 1875 - McCord Museum
Photograph:Montreal City Hall, about 1878 - McCord Museum
Photograph:Montreal City Hall, 1896 - McCord Museum
Photograph:Montreal City Hall, 1913 - McCord Museum

Beaux-Arts architecture in Canada
City Hall
Buildings and structures on the National Historic Sites of Canada register
Burned buildings and structures in Canada
City and town halls in Quebec
Government buildings completed in 1878
Landmarks in Montreal
National Historic Sites in Quebec
Old Montreal
Rebuilt buildings and structures in Canada
Second Empire architecture in Canada